Cyperus subtenuis is a species of sedge that is native to parts of the Caribbean.

See also 
 List of Cyperus species

References 

subtenuis
Plants described in 2005
Flora of Cuba
Flora of Haiti
Flora of Jamaica
Flora of Puerto Rico
Flora without expected TNC conservation status